Alan Matthew Hastings is a mathematical ecologist and distinguished professor in the Department of Environmental Science and Policy at the University of California, Davis. In 2005 he became a fellow of the American Academy of Arts and Sciences and in 2006 he won the Robert H. MacArthur Award.

In 2008, he founded the journal Theoretical Ecology, in which he currently holds the position of editor in chief. Formerly, he was co-editor in chief of the Journal of Mathematical Biology. His research expands through many areas in theoretical ecology including spatial ecology, biological invasions, structured populations, and model fitting.

Academic career 
Alan Hastings published his first paper, dealing with eliminating viability differences in computing recombination percentages, in 1972 at the age of 19.  This was the beginning of an extensive career in theoretical and mathematical ecology, with Alan credited for another 333 publications since.  He received his Bachelors of Science in mathematics from Cornell University the following year, and he would follow this up with a Masters in Applied Mathematics from Cornell in 1975.  Alan finished his formal education with a Ph.D. in Applied Mathematics with minors in Population Ecology and Population Genetics from Cornell in 1977, with his dissertation being done on population biology modeling.  He began a career in education in 1977 at Washington State University, where he worked as an assistant professor in the Department of Pure and Applied Mathematics for two years.  In 1979, he began working as an assistant professor for the University of California, Davis, where he has been teaching ever since.  Alan started off in the Department of Mathematics, and continued there between 1979 and 1989, becoming an associate Professor in 1982, and a fully fledged Professor in 1985.  In 1983, he also began working in the Department of Environmental Science, where he worked until 2019 when he became a distinguished Professor Emeritus.  Hastings is an External Professor at the Santa Fe Institute, a position held since 2018.

Reputation 
Alan is noted for his "exceptional and original contributions to ecology and evolutionary biology", "earning honors including election to the National Academy of Sciences  and the  American Academy of Arts and Sciences".  With 36,590 citations as of 2021, Alan is possibly the most respected and referenced theoretical ecologists in the world.  His work includes "cornerstone papers on  population dynamics in stochastic environments" which have led to "major advances in theory, and also deeply influenced practice in the conservation of species".  Alan continues to run the Hastings lab at the University of California, Davis, where he is beloved by the "numerous outstanding young scientists" he has trained.

Honors and awards 
 Member, National Academy of Sciences (Elected 2015)
 Fellow, American Academy of Arts and Sciences (Elected 2005)
 Robert H. MacArthur Award, Ecological Society of America (2006)
 Faculty Research Lecturer, University of California, Davis (2006–2007)
 Fellow, Society for Mathematical Biology (Elected 2017, Inaugural Class)
 Fellow, Society for Industrial and Applied Mathematics (Elected 2013)
 Fellow, Ecological Society of America (Elected 2012, Inaugural Class)
 Fellow, American Association for the Advancement of Science (Elected 2005)
 Honorary Editor, Journal of Mathematical Biology (2011–)
 NSF Predoctoral Fellowship (1974–1977)
 Ford Foundation Fellowship for Engineering Research Relevant to Society (1973–1974)

Bibliography
 Alan Hastings. (1997). Population biology: concepts and models. New York: Springer.

References

Mathematical ecologists
American ecologists
Cornell University alumni
University of California, Davis faculty
Fellows of the Society for Industrial and Applied Mathematics
Theoretical biologists
Living people
Year of birth missing (living people)
Fellows of the Ecological Society of America